Declan Mountford (born 13 February 1997) is a professional Australian rules footballer who played for the North Melbourne Football Club and the West Coast Eagles Football Club in the Australian Football League (AFL) and is currently playing for Claremont Football Club in the West Australian Football League (WAFL). Mountford was born in the small town of Manypeaks in the Great Southern region of Western Australia. After playing colts and senior football at North Albany Football Club as well as five games in the NAB AFL Under-18 Championships, he moved to Perth playing for Claremont Football Club.

He was drafted by the North Melbourne Football Club with their fifth selection and sixtieth overall in the 2015 national draft. Following the draft Mountford played for Werribee Football Club, who are affiliated to North Melbourne, during the 2016 season in the Victorian Football League, as both a midfielder and as a tagger.

He made his AFL debut in the forty-three point loss against  in the opening round of the 2017 season at Etihad Stadium.

He was delisted by North Melbourne at the end of the 2018 season and returned to Western Australia to play for Claremont. In 2021 he was appointed as the co-captain of Claremont and represented Western Australia in the interstate match against South Australia.

Mountford returned to the AFL for the West Coast Eagles in Round 2 of the 2022 season as part of the club's top-up list, after the club was hit by injuries and COVID-19 protocols. Mountford was entered into the squad after midfielder Jackson Nelson suffered a knee injury during a warm-up session, forcing West Coast coach Adam Simpson to call him up against his old side North Melbourne. He got another opportunity in round 8 against Brisbane. Mountford had 8 disposals as a medi-sub.

References

External links

1997 births
Living people
North Albany Football Club players
North Melbourne Football Club players
Werribee Football Club players
Claremont Football Club players
Australian rules footballers from Western Australia
West Coast Eagles players